Opinion polling has been commissioned throughout the duration of the 23rd parliamentary term and in the leadup to the 2011 election by various organisations. The sample size, margin of error and confidence interval of each poll varies by organisation and date.

Poll results
Results of several polling organisations together:

Poll results by Andy-Ar
Results of Andy-Ar:

Poll results by Konsensus
Results of Konsensus Research & Consultanty:

References

Turkey
2011 Turkish general election
2011